The Complete Columbia Album Collection is a box set by country singer Johnny Cash, released posthumously in 2012 on Columbia Records and Legacy Recordings.

The set consists of 63 CDs, the majority of which are reissues of 59 albums released by Cash during his 1958–1986 tenure with Columbia. Each CD is packaged in a replica of the original LP cover, with any albums originally issued as two-LP set condensed onto one disc with the exception of The Gospel Road which remains in a two-CD configuration. Bonus material includes a two-CD set titled The Singles, Plus, compiling non-album tracks and duets taken from other albums; a Carter Family album on which Cash provided guest vocals; the two albums Cash recorded for Columbia as a member of the supergroup The Highwaymen; and an extended edition of the Sun Records album With His Hot and Blue Guitar with additional tracks from the Sun era (including the complete contents of his second Sun album, Sings the Songs That Made Him Famous). Hot and Blue Guitar is the only album to be presented in an extended edition; all other albums are featured with their original contents, without augmentation. As such this is not a complete survey of everything Cash recorded for Columbia; for example, additional performances from the At Folsom Prison and At San Quentin live shows, included on separate reissues of the two albums, are not included. Also omitted is the 1975 album Destination Victoria Station which had featured new performances of previously released recordings, the 1961 Andre Kostelanetz orchestral album The Lure of the Grand Canyon which had been narrated by Cash, the 1980 gospel album A Believer Sings the Truth (recorded for Columbia but released on another label), as well as most of the tracks issued on Columbia's Bootleg series of 2011–2012. Out Among the Stars, a complete album recorded by Cash in the early 1980s but not released at that time, is also omitted as it would not be released officially until 2014.

Many of the albums featured in the set make their CD debut in the collection. According to country historian Rich Kienzle's liner notes (part of a 200-page book included in the set), one album Koncert V Praze (In Prague–Live) received its first North American release in the set.

Album list
The Fabulous Johnny Cash
Hymns by Johnny Cash
Songs of Our Soil
Now, There Was a Song!
Ride This Train
Hymns from the Heart
The Sound of Johnny Cash
Blood, Sweat and Tears
Ring of Fire: The Best of Johnny Cash
The Christmas Spirit
 Keep on the Sunny Side – The Carter Family with special guest Johnny Cash
I Walk the Line
Bitter Tears: Ballads of the American Indian
Orange Blossom Special
Sings the Ballads of the True West
Everybody Loves a Nut
Happiness Is You
Carryin' On with Johnny Cash and June Carter
From Sea to Shining Sea
Johnny Cash at Folsom Prison
The Holy Land
Johnny Cash at San Quentin
Hello, I'm Johnny Cash
The Johnny Cash Show
I Walk the Line
Little Fauss and Big Halsy
Man in Black
A Thing Called Love
America: A 200-Year Salute in Story and Song
The Johnny Cash Family Christmas
Any Old Wind That Blows
The Gospel Road (disc 1)
The Gospel Road (disc 2)
Johnny Cash and His Woman
På Österåker
Ragged Old Flag
Junkie and the Juicehead Minus Me
The Johnny Cash Children's Album
Sings Precious Memories
John R. Cash
Look at Them Beans
Strawberry Cake
One Piece at a Time
The Last Gunfighter Ballad
The Rambler
I Would Like to See You Again
Gone Girl
Silver
Rockabilly Blues
Classic Christmas
The Baron
The Survivors Live – Johnny Cash, Jerry Lee Lewis, Carl Perkins
The Adventures of Johnny Cash
Johnny 99
Koncert V Praze (In Prague–Live)
Rainbow
Highwayman – Waylon Jennings, Willie Nelson, Johnny Cash, Kris Kristofferson
Heroes – Johnny Cash & Waylon Jennings
Highwayman 2 – Waylon Jennings, Willie Nelson, Johnny Cash, Kris Kristofferson
At Madison Square Garden

 Note: Tracks 1–12 are the original album line-up; Tracks 13–28 are exclusive to this reissue.

References 

2012 compilation albums
Johnny Cash compilation albums
Columbia Records compilation albums